Ahirani is a village in Pindra Tehsil of Varanasi district in the Indian state of Uttar Pradesh. Ahirani falls under Nathaiya Pur gram panchayat. The village is about 31.0 kilometers North-West of Varanasi city, 272 kilometers South-East of state capital Lucknow and 794 kilometers South-East of the national capital Delhi.

Demography
Ahirani has a total population of 923 people amongst 137 families. Sex ratio of Ahirani is 956 and child sex ratio is 1,098. Uttar Pradesh state average for both ratios is 912 and 902 respectively .

Transportation
Ahirani can be accessed by road and does not have a railway station of its own. Closest railway station to this village is Kapseti railway station (19 kilometers South-West). Nearest operational airports are Varanasi airport (13 kilometers South-East) and Allahabad Airports (132 kilometers West).

See also

Pindra Tehsil
Pindra (Assembly constituency)

Notes
  All demographic data is based on 2011 Census of India.

References 

Villages in Varanasi district